"Rock Is Dead" is a song by the Doors, recorded on February 25, 1969, at Sunset Sound Recorders in the Hollywood neighborhood of Los Angeles. Doors singer Jim Morrison described the recording as "throwing up these old songs in the studio. Blues trips. Rock classics... the whole history of rock music—blues, rock and roll, Latin jazz, surf music". The song credits acknowledge some of the writers of the original songs. It featured session musician Harvey Brooks on bass guitar.

Background
According to biographer Stephen Davis, the song began as a jam in the studio after a night out dining and drinking at a local Mexican restaurant: "the band played free-form R&B, improvising about the death of rock and roll". He added the song was:

A heavily edited version lasting 16:30 was released on The Doors: Box Set in 1997 and the 50th Anniversary Edition of The Soft Parade contains the complete 64:03 version.

Critical reception
In an AllMusic review of The Doors Box Set, critic Bruce Eder commented:  "the 16-and-half-minute jam/rap (including a reference to 'Mystery Train') from the Morrison Hotel sessions, entitled 'Rock Is Dead,' where, fueled on wine and good food, they let the tape roll on this astonishing extended musical moment. Here, Morrison's singing, two years beforehand, gets fully at the raw, bluesy sound it would acquire for the subsequent L.A. Woman album."

Richie Unterberger in his review of the 50th Anniversary Edition of The Soft Parade, noted "The centerpiece of these two bonus discs is 'Rock Is Dead,' an hour-long studio blues jam that has been heavily bootlegged but never released in this complete form. Alternately maddening and compelling, 'Rock Is Dead' is worth the price of admission."

References

1969 songs
The Doors songs
Songs written by Jim Morrison
Songs written by Ray Manzarek
Songs written by Robby Krieger
Songs written by John Densmore
Songs about rock music